FC Real-Succes was a Moldovan football club from Hîrtopul Mare, Moldova. They played in the Moldovan "B" Division, the third tier of Moldovan football.

History 
Football Club Real-Succes was founded in 2008. The same year they participated in 2008–09 Moldovan "B" Division and finished 10th. In summer 2009 they merged with amateur football club Lilcora to form a new club RS Lilcora.

League results 
{|class="wikitable"
|-bgcolor="#efefef"
! Season
! Div.
! Pos.
! Pl.
! W
! D
! L
! GS
! GA
! P
!Cup
!colspan=2|Europe
!Top Scorer (League)
!Head Coach
|-
|align=center|2008–09
|align=center|3rd"North"
|align=center|10
|align=center|5
|align=center|2
|align=center|15
|align=center|4
|align=center|37
|align=center|86
|align=center|17
|align=center|Round of 64
|align=center colspan=2|—
|align=left|
|align=left|
|}

See also
RS Lilcora FC

References
 Club profile  at weltfussballarchiv.com/

Real-Succes, FC
Real-Succes, FC
Real-Succes, FC
2008 establishments in Moldova
2009 disestablishments in Moldova